Mirax may refer to:

 Mirax (medication)
 Mirax Group, Russian investment and development company
 Mirax-Plaza Russia, a mixed use development in Moscow, Russia
 Mirax-Plaza Ukraine, a 46-storey building under construction in Kiev, Ukraine
 Mirax of Egypt,  martyr
 Mirax Terrik, Star Wars Legends character